Frank Dixon may refer to:

 Frank Dixon (lacrosse) (1878–1932), Canadian lacrosse player
 Frank M. Dixon (1892–1965), Alabama politician
 Frank J. Dixon (1920–2008), scientist
 Franklin W. Dixon, pseudonym of the author of The Hardy Boys

See also
Francis Dixon (disambiguation)